Sio Julian Savea (born 7 August 1990) is a New Zealand rugby union player. Between 2012 and 2017 he won 54 caps for New Zealand.

He has also represented New Zealand at sevens and at under-20 level. Savea is nicknamed "The Bus", a moniker bestowed by under-20s coach Dave Rennie. Savea was a key member of 2015 Rugby World Cup winning team, and was the highest try scorer of the tournament, with 8 tries. Savea is one of the highest try-scorers in New Zealand's history, scoring 46 through the duration of his international career.

Savea was nominated for World Rugby Player of the Year in 2014 and 2015, winning the award for Try of the Year in 2015.

Early career
Savea attended Rongotai College in Wellington, New Zealand. In 2008, Savea made the New Zealand secondary schools team and the Hurricanes academy squad. In 2009, Savea debuted for the New Zealand sevens at the 2009 Adelaide Sevens. In 2010, Savea was selected for the New Zealand U-20 team to play at the 2010 IRB Junior World Championship in Argentina. He scored 8 tries in the tournament which New Zealand won and was named IRB Junior Player of the year. Savea was rewarded for his good form by being picked in the 2010 Wellington Lions squad to play in the 2010 ITM Cup. In 2010 Savea was touted as 'the next Jonah Lomu'.

Domestic career

Hurricanes
In 2012, Savea played in his second season for the Hurricanes. While he had a quiet 2011 season, his 2012 form earned him a call-up into the All Blacks for the three-test series with Ireland.

Savea had a poor season in 2016 and was benched for the Hurricanes' last 3 matches of the season in the knockout rounds, with Jason Woodward, former All Black Cory Jane and James Marshall the team's preferred back three players by the end of the season. Savea was also benched for the semi-final against the Lions in Johannesburg the following year after Vince Aso returned from injury. Savea had been quiet all season, with Wes Goosen replacing him as the starting left wing for the draw to the Lions.

Savea scored 50 tries for the Hurricanes during his Super Rugby career, which ended in 2018 after his signing to Toulon. Savea played 116 games for the Hurricanes during his Super Rugby career and is one of the most-capped Super Rugby players in history. Savea played his final game for the Hurricanes during the 2018 Super Rugby season's semi-final, against the Crusaders, on 28 July when the Crusaders knocked the Hurricanes out of the competition, with the Hurricanes losing 12-30.

Wellington Lions
He marked his first-class debut in July 2010 with a length of the field runaway try that clinched an ITM Cup pre-season win for the Wellington Lions over Canterbury. He started on the right wing in 12 of 14 ITM Cup games, scoring a further eight tries including a try on championship debut against Tasman and two more the following week against Otago.

Savea was not selected for the All Blacks for the 2017 Rugby Championship, therefore played his first game for Wellington in four years on the right wing as a result. Following an injury to Brad Shields, Savea took over the team as captain until Shields returned from injury.

International career

All Blacks
Savea was named in the 2012 All Black squad, his first season of international rugby.
On 9 June 2012, Savea scored three tries on his debut for the All Blacks against Ireland in the first test at Eden Park. He is the first All Black to score three tries against Ireland in a test match, and the fourth to score three tries on his All Black test debut. Since his debut, Savea has been one of the most prolific tryscorers in international rugby.

Savea became a regular starter for the All Blacks across his first few years. In 2014, Savea was nominated for World Rugby's Player of the Year award, which was ultimately won by teammate Brodie Retallick.

Savea was named in the 31-man All Black squad for the 2015 Rugby World Cup, where he scored 8 tries across the tournament having played in many games throughout the tournament. Savea's 8 tries saw him equal the record for most tries in a single tournament, previously achieved by the late former All Black Jonah Lomu and South Africa's Bryan Habana. Two of these games played saw Savea score hat-tricks, including a quarter-final game against France. The hat-trick Savea scored against France saw him being compared to Lomu. Savea, having been one of the best-performing players of the tournament, was again nominated for World Rugby's "Player of The Year" award which was won by teammate Dan Carter, and was also the winner of "Try of The Year" for one of his tries against France in the World Cup.

Despite continuing to score tries in 2016, Savea was seriously out of form. When Waisake Naholo was injury-free he was selected over Savea as the starting left wing, with Israel Dagg on the right wing. Savea continued to start internationally due to injuries to Naholo and Nehe Milner-Skudder, the latter of whom did not play internationally all year due to a shoulder reconstruction surgery. Savea came off the bench to become the fifth New Zealander to score 40 tries in international rugby when he touched down against Australia in Sydney on 20 August 2016. Savea was the fastest to do so, as this was his 44th match. He overtook former All Black wing Joe Rokocoko's record of 40 tries from 46 tests as the All Blacks won against the Wallabies 42-8.

On 16 June 2017, Savea charged his way over the chalk against Samoa marking his 46th test try during the 78-0 win. This made Savea the second-highest try scorer of any All Black, tying with Rokocoko and former All Blacks fullback Christian Cullen.

Savea lost his starting spot in the All Blacks to rookie Blues wing Rieko Ioane for the first two tests against the British and Irish Lions in 2017, but started in the third test on 8 July 2017, for his final appearance in the black jersey, following injury to Waisake Naholo and Ioane having illness. Savea played badly, botching a potential try and being exploited on defence.

After poor performances across the 2016 and 2017 seasons, Savea was dropped from the All Blacks squad for the 2017 Rugby Championship when the team was named on his 27th birthday, with Ioane, Naholo and Hurricanes team-mate Nehe Milner-Skudder all recovering from injury and illness.

Despite numerous injuries to the All Blacks' outside backs in the 2017 season, Savea was not re-called for international rugby, with Seta Tamanivalu, David Havili and Matt Duffie preferred as injury cover for the 2017 end-of-season tour squad over Savea. This prompted Savea to play for the Barbarians Club against his former All Blacks team-mates on 5 November 2017. Savea played the full 80 minutes for the Barbarians but failed to make an impact, with Crusaders winger and Barbarians team-mate George Bridge overshadowing Savea and scoring two tries as the Barbarians lost 22-31 to the All Blacks, who featured Savea's younger brother Ardie Savea.

International tries

New Zealand U20
Julian Savea was named the 2010 IRB Junior Player of the Year. He was the star of the IRB World U20 tournament, scoring eight tries in three games; he scored four tries in one match against Samoa, and two each against Wales and South Africa. Savea featured on the right wing for New Zealand in the 2010 World U20 tournament.

New Zealand Sevens
Savea debuted for the New Zealand Sevens team at the 2009 Dubai Sevens, and played in the Sevens tournaments at Hong Kong, Adelaide, London and Scotland.

Personal life
Savea is of Samoan descent.

In April 2013 Savea was charged over a domestic violence incident involving his partner. The charges were later withdrawn after Savea completed police diversion. Savea had previously appeared on posters for an anti-domestic violence campaign, 'It's Not OK'.

In December 2015, Savea married his girlfriend of 3 years, Fatima. The couple announced via Instagram that they are expecting their first child in December 2017. Their daughter, Jude Telesia Savea was born on 7 December 2017.

References

External links
 
 All Blacks sevens profile
 Hurricanes profile
 Wellington profile
 itsrugby.co.uk profile
 ESPN Profile

1990 births
Living people
Rugby union wings
Rugby union centres
New Zealand rugby union players
New Zealand international rugby union players
Hurricanes (rugby union) players
Wellington rugby union players
New Zealand sportspeople of Samoan descent
Rugby union players from Wellington City
People educated at Rongotai College
New Zealand international rugby sevens players
RC Toulonnais players